The Colin Low Award is an annual Canadian film award, presented to honour the best Canadian documentary film screened at that year's DOXA Documentary Film Festival. The award frequently, but not always, presents an honorable mention in addition to the overall winner.

The award is named in honour of influential Canadian documentary filmmaker Colin Low.

Winners

References

External links
DOXA Documentary Film Festival

Canadian documentary film awards